Øyvind Gjerde (born 18 March 1977) is a Norwegian former footballer who played for Molde.  He has previously played for the clubs Åndalsnes, Lillestrøm and Aalesund.

After the 2010 season, when he did not get a new contract with Molde after 7 years in the club, Gjerde announced that he would most likely retire.

References 

1977 births
Living people
Sportspeople from Møre og Romsdal
Norwegian footballers
Eliteserien players
Norwegian First Division players
Aalesunds FK players
Lillestrøm SK players
Molde FK players

Association football defenders